This is a list of the tallest buildings in Venezuela.

List of highest buildings in Venezuela

List of skyscrapers under construction

Timeline

See also

List of tallest buildings in South America

Tallest
Venezuela

Venezuela